Mongo is a department of Nyanga Province in Gabon.  Its chief town is the city of Moulengui-Binza. It had a population of 2,602 in 2013.

References 

Departments of Gabon